H. Imam Utomo S (born 14 May 1943) is a former governor of East Java in Indonesia. He was born in Jombang, East Java, and was governor from 1998 to 2003 and again from 2003 to 2008.

References

1943 births
Living people
People from Jombang Regency
Governors of East Java